The 1868 Waikouaiti by-election was a by-election held on 27 July 1868 in the  electorate during the 4th New Zealand Parliament.

The by-election was caused by the resignation of the incumbent MP William Murison on 10 July 1868.

The by-election was won by Robert Mitchell.

Mitchell stood for the "Centralist" party while his opponent William Pitt Gordon stood "in the Provincial Interest."

Results
The following table gives the election result:

References

Waikouaiti, 1868
1868 elections in New Zealand
Politics of Otago
July 1868 events
Waikouaiti